Mosha (also Romanized as Moshā’ and Mashā‘) is a village in Tarrud Rural District, in the Central District of Damavand County, Tehran Province, Iran. At the 2006 census, its population was 1,542, in 454 families.

References 

Populated places in Damavand County